Oskaloosa Community School District is a public school district headquartered in Oskaloosa, Iowa. The district is completely within Mahasaka County, and serves the city of Oskaloosa and surrounding areas including the towns of Beacon, Keomah Village, and University Park.

Paula Wright was hired as district superintendent in 2018.

Schools
The district operate three schools, and an administration building, all in Oskaloosa:
 Webster Building
 Oskaloosa Elementary School
 Oskaloosa Middle School
 Oskaloosa High School

See also
List of school districts in Iowa

References

External links
 Oskaloosa Community School District
School districts in Iowa
Schools in Mahaska County, Iowa